Der Westwall is a 1939 film about the Siegfried Line directed by Fritz Hippler, the head of the film division within the Propagandaministerium. The Siegfried Line, called the West Wall by the Germans, was a large series of fortifications around the German borders with France, Belgium, Luxembourg, and the Netherlands.

See also 
List of German films 1933-1945

External links 

Available at Archive.org

1939 documentary films
1939 films
Black-and-white documentary films
German documentary films
Films of Nazi Germany
1930s German-language films
Nazi propaganda films
Films directed by Fritz Hippler
German black-and-white films
World War II films made in wartime
1930s German films